The 2013 Campeonato Baiano de Futebol was the 109th season of Bahia's top professional football league. The competition began on January 20 and ended on May 19. Vitória won the championship by the 27th time, while Fluminense de Feira and Atlético Alagoinhas were relegated.

Format
The championship has three stages. On the first stage, all teams except those who are playing in the 2013 Copa do Nordeste play a single round-robin. The best five teams qualifies to the second stage. Also, the best team in this stage qualifies to the 2014 Copa do Nordeste, and the second best qualifies to the 2014 Copa do Brasil. The two worst teams in this stage are relegated.

On the second stage, the teams are joined by the clubs from Bahia who were playing in Copa do Nordeste. The teams are put in two groups. The clubs from each group faces all clubs in the other group. The two best teams in each group qualify to the Final stage. In the final stage, it's a playoff with four teams.

The best team who is not in Campeonato Brasileiro Série A, Série B or Série C qualifies to Série D. The champion also qualifies to the 2014 Copa do Brasil.

Participating teams

First stage

Results

Second stage
Teams from each group face the teams in the other group twice.

Group 1

Group 2

Results

Final stage

Semifinals

First leg

Second leg

Third-place play-off

Finals

References

Baiano
Campeonato Baiano